Arizona Business Magazine, based out of Phoenix, Arizona, is a monthly business magazine. Published by AZ Big Media, the magazine covers a wide range of topics focusing on the Arizona business scene and is aimed at high-level corporate executives and business owners.

History
Arizona Business Magazine began in 1985, when publisher Michael Atkinson purchased a 2-year-old publication called Arizona Office Guide to Phoenix, a quarterly controlled circulation magazine of 7,000 that focused solely on the Phoenix office market.

In 1986, the publication’s name was changed to Arizona Business & Development Magazine. It also broadened its commercial real estate focus and increased circulation to 20,000.

In 1988, the publication’s name was changed to its current title, Arizona Business Magazine. The magazine began covering the entire Arizona business market and increased circulation to 25,000. In addition, Arizona Business Magazine moved to a bimonthly format.

Arizona Business Magazine also introduced special supplements. In partnership with area business organizations, Arizona Business Magazine publishes special sections within its pages on association groups, their work and their members. Arizona Business Magazine re-prints copies of the supplements with their own covers free of charge to each association.

Arizona Business Magazine today 
In February 2008, Arizona Business Magazine became a monthly publication to increase its market share and distribution. Since becoming monthly, the magazine has featured stories on such Arizona-based companies as U.S. Airways, Shamrock Foods, Dial Corp. and AVNET. The magazine has also tackled major issues affecting the state economy, such as the sub-prime collapse, the credit crunch, international trade and sustainability. In addition, the magazine has examined the state’s immigration issue.

Of the Arizona business and community leaders profiled in the magazine, the list includes Intel Chairman Craig Barrett, former NBA Phoenix Suns owner Jerry Colangelo, Bashas' Family of Stores Chairman Eddie Basha Jr., as well as Gov. Janet Napolitano and former Congressman J.D. Hayworth. Experts from Arizona State University's W.P. Carey School of Business are often quoted within the pages of Arizona Business Magazine.

Despite the changes, the supplements still remain an important part of Arizona Business Magazine. Organizations featured in the supplements include the Greater Phoenix Economic Council, Valley Forward, East Valley Partnership, the Arizona Hospital & Healthcare Association, and the Greater Phoenix Convention & Visitors Bureau.

The magazine later returned to a bimonthly publication schedule.

Leadership
The top leadership at AZ Big Media consists of:

Michael Atkinson, president and CEO
Audrey Webb, vice president of operations
Cheryl Green, publisher
Michael Gossie is editor-in-chief of Arizona Business Magazine. In his capacity as editor-in-chief, Gossie oversees editorial content for all seven magazines and corresponding websites that are published by AZ Big Media.

References

External links
 
 AZ Big Media
 Phoenix news from KTVK and azfamily.com

1985 establishments in Arizona
Bimonthly magazines published in the United States
Business magazines published in the United States
Magazines established in 1985
Magazines published in Arizona
Mass media in Phoenix, Arizona
Monthly magazines published in the United States